Casey Luong (born November 4, 1994), known mononymously by his stage name Keshi (stylized in all lowercase), is an American singer, songwriter, record producer, and multi-instrumentalist. Known for his distant falsetto vocals and textural instrumentals, he has accumulated over one billion streams with songs such as "Like I Need U", "2 Soon" and "Right Here".

Early life

Luong was born in Houston, Texas, to Vietnamese parents and grew up in Sugar Land. Despite living in an ethnically diverse community with a large Asian population, he recalls that he often felt out of place and disconnected from his heritage while growing up, as others around him were mostly ethnically Chinese. When he was 13, he began learning the guitar after picking it up from his grandfather. He began teaching himself the instrument while using his grandfather's Vietnamese music book. Another one of his motivations for learning guitar came from watching Drake Bell on the Nickelodeon TV show Drake & Josh. He cites John Mayer and Ed Sheeran as his biggest influences as a kid. 

He graduated from Stephen F. Austin High School in Sugar Land and earned a Bachelor of Science in Nursing from the University of Texas at Austin. He then worked as an oncology nurse at the Texas Medical Center for two years.

The stage name "Keshi" comes from the childhood name that his fiancée's parents gave him. They have been childhood friends since 5th grade. Whenever he visited, her parents would call him "Keshi", which they still do to this day.

Career
He created the moniker "Keshi" and began to share music via his SoundCloud page around 2017. He credited watching YouTube tutorials for teaching him how to write, produce, and engineer his music. Initially, he was in doubt of his abilities and musical direction, but slowly his distinct style, which relies on his dreamy vocals combined with lo-fi beats and guitar, garnered more attention and popularity. In 2019, he quit his job as a nurse and flew to New York City to sign with Island Records. From there, his first singles attracted millions of listeners upon release. 

He cites John Mayer, Frank Ocean, The 1975, Drake, and Bryson Tiller as some of his greatest musical influences.

Discography

Studio albums

Extended plays

Single albums

Singles

Songwriting credits

Tours 
 Hell/Heaven Tour (North America + Europe) (2022)
 Hell/Heaven Tour (Asia + Australia + New Zealand + Hawaii) (2022)
 Hell & Back Tour (2023)

See also 
 History of Vietnamese Americans in Houston

References

External links
 

1994 births
American rhythm and blues singers
People from Houston
Vietnamese-American culture in Texas
Living people
Keshi
Lo-fi musicians
American musicians of Vietnamese descent